I Think We're Alone Now is the third of three studio albums by the pop rock band Tommy James and the Shondells, released in 1967.

The album had three singles that charted.  The title track went to #4 on the Billboard Hot 100.  "Mirage" reached #10 on the chart. "I Like the Way" reached #25 on the chart. The album landed on the Billboard 200, reaching #74.

Original copies feature a black album cover with two pairs of yellow bare footsteps walking side by side, then facing each other near the top of the cover.  This was deemed too controversial for the time and was changed to a yellow cover with a photo of the group.

The album represents a shift in direction from the first two Tommy James and the Shondells albums.  Those records, particularly the debut album, contained more oldies and "frat rock" songs.  Under the slick, updated production of Bo Gentry and Ritchie Cordell, only two songs included in this album -- "California Sun" and "Shout" -- were oldies.  Of those two songs, the former was partially, and incorrectly, attributed to Morris Levy, who owned James' recording label, Roulette Records.  In the tradition of 1950s rock entrepreneurs (e.g., Alan Freed), Levy sometimes added his name to the composer's credit on Roulette recordings in order to receive royalty payments for the song.

Moreover, the lineup of the Shondells changed for the disc as well.  Joe Kessler and Vinnie Pietropaoli, who played on the first two albums by the group, were no longer part of the band.  It was also George Magura's last LP with the Shondells.  Instead, the record featured the classic Shondells lineup of Mike Vale, Ronnie Rosman, Ed Gray, and Pete Lucia, which remained constant through their last album.

Track listing 
All songs written and composed by Ritchie Cordell except where noted.

Personnel
Bass, piano: Mike Vale
Drums: Peter Lucia
Guitars: Ed Gray, Tommy James
Bass, piano, tenor sax, vibraphone: George Magura
Piano, organ, cordovox, accordion: Ronnie Rosman
Producer: Bo Gentry, Ritchie Cordell
Arranger: Jimmy Wisner
Engineer: Bruce Staple
Recorded at: Allegro Studios

Charts
Album

Singles

References

1967 albums
Tommy James and the Shondells albums
Roulette Records albums